Gymnoscelis lavella is a moth in the family Geometridae. It was described by Louis Beethoven Prout in 1958. It is found on the Solomon Islands.

References

Moths described in 1958
lavella